Carrallukë is a village in Malishevë municipality, Kosovo.

Notes

References

Villages in Mališevo